Prince Kindavong (1900 – 30 March 1951) was a Laotian prince and the younger half-brother of Phetsarath Ratanavongsa. During World War II he was secretly sent by King Sisavang Vong to represent Laos to the Allied forces following the Japanese occupation of Laos and the royal capital at Luang Prabang on 7 April 1945. He later became the 2nd Prime Minister of Laos from April 23, 1946 to March 15, 1947.

References

Laotian princes
Prime Ministers of Laos
1900 births
1951 deaths